Penn Lee is an unincorporated community in Lee County, Virginia, in the United States.

History
Penn Lee took its name from the Penn Lee Coal Co.

References

Unincorporated communities in Lee County, Virginia
Unincorporated communities in Virginia